Menjab-e Qadim (also romanized as Menjāb-e Qadīm and Manjāb-e Qadīm; also known as Menjāb and Menjāv-e Qadīm) is a village in Dodangeh Rural District, Hurand District, Ahar County, East Azerbaijan Province, Iran. At the 2006 census, its population was 144, in 38 families.

References 

Populated places in Ahar County